Józef Kapustka (Tarnów, 1969) is a Polish classical pianist. He currently lives in Paris, France.

Biography and schooling 
Jozef Kapustka was born in 1969. He began receiving early musical tuition from local instructor Danuta Cieślik at the age of 3. He then briefly studied at the State Higher Academy of Music in Kraków with Ewa Bukojemska. Having graduated from The Juilliard School in New York (Bachelor of Music degree, 1992; piano with Josef Raieff, then Jerome Lowenthal and chamber music with Joseph Fuchs), he moved on to obtain a Postgraduate Advanced Studies Diploma specializing in piano performance from the Royal Academy of Music in London (1997), with Martin Roscoe. He also worked with Dimitri Bashkirov (masterclasses held under auspices of the Queen Sofía College of Music in Spain) and Vera Gornostaeva in Paris and Moscow. Being an alumnus of the Music Academy of the West in Santa Barbara, 1991, he holds a Diplome superieur de la langue et civilization francaise from Paris Sorbonne University (1994). In 1994 he received the Grand Prix of the Conservatoire International de Musique de Paris. He was nominated for the Molière award in 2010 (Best musical play: Diva à Sarcelles, written and directed by Virginie Lemoine).

Performances
Kapustka has performed in Europe (2008 Europe's Day recital at Le Havre, France; recitals for the 2010 Chopin Year celebrations in France, 2011 Liszt Bicentenary concerts in Great Britain); USA - Lincoln Center appearances 1989-1992, Juilliard IBM concert series, Kosciuszko Foundation-Hunter College Music series broadcast live on WQXR New York classical radio, Carnegie Recital Hall 1997, United Nations on invitation from the Russian Permanent Mission 2004. In 2010 he initiated a Bach in Rio project, playing and recording selected Bach keyboard concerti with the Orquestra de Cordas da Grota in Rio de Janeiro, Brazil.

Discography

 Jozef Kapustka:Improvisations with Bashir (DUX/Naxos/HMV Japan 2013)

References

External links
 
 Biography from www.concerts.fr
 Biography from www.theatreonline.com
 on the Polish Music Information Center page
 on the Polish Cultural Promotion Center page
 interview with Lucy Nixon for the RAM on-line
 Juilliard notable alumni on Manhattan.org page
 on the Polish Cultural Institute in London page
 on the Polish Cultural Institute in Paris page

Living people
Polish classical pianists
Male classical pianists
1969 births
Alumni of the Royal Academy of Music
Juilliard School alumni
University of Paris alumni
Polish emigrants to France
Reina Sofía School of Music alumni
21st-century classical pianists
21st-century male musicians